Tobias Schröck (born 31 December 1992) is a German professional footballer who plays as a midfielder for FC Ingolstadt.

Career
In 2011, Schröck was promoted from the youth to the Wacker Burghausen senior squad. He had a contract with Wacker Burghausen until 2015. In May 2015, he signed a contract with SG Sonnenhof Großaspach until 2017. In June 2016, after his club Würzburger Kickers were relegated to the 3. Liga, he signed for 2. Bundesliga side FC Ingolstadt until 2021.

References

External links
 
 
 

1992 births
Living people
People from Mühldorf
Sportspeople from Upper Bavaria
German footballers
Footballers from Bavaria
Association football midfielders
2. Bundesliga players
3. Liga players
Regionalliga players
SV Wacker Burghausen players
SG Sonnenhof Großaspach players
Würzburger Kickers players
FC Ingolstadt 04 players
FC Ingolstadt 04 II players